General elections were held in India on 22 and 26 November 1989 to elect the members of the 9th Lok Sabha. The incumbent Indian National Congress government under the premiership of Rajiv Gandhi lost its mandate, even though it was still the largest single party in the Lok Sabha. V. P. Singh, the leader of the second largest party Janata Dal (which also headed the National Front) was invited by the President of India to form the government.
The government was formed with outside support from the Bharatiya Janata Party and a Left Front led by CPI (M).
V. P. Singh was sworn in as the seventh Prime Minister of India on 2 December 1989.

Background
The 1989 Indian general election were held because the previous Lok Sabha has been in power for a five years, and the constitution allowed for new elections.  Even though Rajiv Gandhi had won the last election by a landslide, this election saw him trying to fight off scandals that had marred his administration.

The Bofors scandal, rising militancy in Punjab, the civil war between LTTE and Sri Lankan government were just some of the problems that stared at Rajiv's government. Rajiv's biggest critic was Vishwanath Pratap Singh, who had held the portfolios of the finance ministry and the defence ministry in the government.

But Singh was soon sacked from the Cabinet and he then resigned from his memberships in the Congress and the Lok Sabha. He formed the Jan Morcha with Arun Nehru and Arif Mohammad Khan and re-entered the Lok Sabha from Allahabad. Witnessing V P Singh's meteoric rise on national stage, Rajiv tried to counter him with another prominent Rajput stalwart Satyendra Narain Singh but failed eventually.

In this election, Assam never went to the polls. Moreover, the State of Goa, Daman and Diu was bifurcated into Goa and Daman & Diu with Goa retaining its 2 seats and the latter gaining 1 seat. Thus the total Lok Sabha seats increased by 1 to a total of 543. Since Assam never went to the polls, the total seats contested in this election was down to 529.

Results

Aftermath
V. P. Singh, who was the head of the Janata Dal, was chosen leader of the National Front government. His government fell after Singh, along with Bihar's Chief Minister Lalu Prasad Yadav's government, had Advani arrested in Samastipur and stopped his Ram Rath Yatra, which was going to the Babri Masjid site in Ayodhya on 23 October 1990. Bharatiya Janata Party withdrew their support to Singh government, causing them to lose parliamentary vote of confidence on 7 November 1990.

Chandra Shekhar broke away from the Janata Dal with 64 MPs and formed the Samajwadi Janata Party in 1990. He got outside support from the Congress and became the 9th Prime Minister of India. He finally resigned on 21 June 1991, after the Congress alleged that the government was spying on Rajiv Gandhi.

See also
Election Commission of India
1987 Indian presidential election

References

Bibliography

External links

India
 
November 1989 events in Asia
General elections in India